Nightingale is a 1998 recital album of Japanese classical songs by countertenor Yoshikazu Mera.

Track listing
1-6 Song of Aiyan, song cycle for voice & piano by Kosaku Yamada
7-12 Six Songs for Children, for voice & piano	by Ikuma Dan
13-15	Japanese Flute, song cycle for voice, flute & piano by Shiro Fukai
17-20 Four Songs of Dusk, song cycle for voice & piano	by Hikaru Hayashi
21 Cherry Blossoms Lane Sadao Bekku

References

1998 classical albums